"Your Body Is a Weapon" is a song by English indie rock band The Wombats. The single was released in the United Kingdom on 2 October 2013 after making its debut the night before on Zane Lowe's BBC Radio 1 show with an interview from lead singer Matthew Murphy. It is the lead single from the band's third album Glitterbug. The song came in at number 25 on Triple J's Hottest 100 of 2013.

Track listing

Charts

References

The Wombats songs
2013 singles
2013 songs
14th Floor Records singles
Songs written by Matthew Murphy
Songs written by Tord Øverland Knudsen
Songs written by Dan Haggis